Peleș Castle is a Neo-Renaissance castle in the Carpathian Mountains, Romania.

Peleș may also refer to:
 Peleș (river), a tributary of the Prahova in Romania
 Peleș Sporting Association
 Peleș, a village in Sohodol Commune, Alba County, Romania
 Peleș, a village in Lazuri Commune, Satu Mare County, Romania

See also
 Peles (disambiguation)
 Peleșel, a tributary of the river Peleș in Romania
 Pelișor (disambiguation)